Elburton Cross railway station served the suburb of Plymstock, Devon, England from 1898 to 1960 on the Plymouth to Yealmpton Branch.

History 
The station opened on 17 January 1898 by the Great Western Railway. The ticket sales were initially high for the time, with 11,355 tickets selling in 1903. The sales were higher in 1913, with 20,831 tickets selling. It steadily began to decline due to competition with the roads. Only 5,818 tickets and 32 season tickets were sold in 1929. The station closed to passengers in July 1930. It reopened on 3 November 1941 for those who were forced to leave their homes due to the World War II blitz. It was shown as Elburton in the 1942 edition of the handbook of stations. It closed again to passengers on 6 October 1947 and to goods traffic on 29 July 1960.

References

External links 

Disused railway stations in Devon
Former Great Western Railway stations
Railway stations in Great Britain opened in 1898
Railway stations in Great Britain closed in 1930
Railway stations in Great Britain opened in 1941
Railway stations in Great Britain closed in 1947
1898 establishments in England
1960 disestablishments in England